Mayrouba Club is a basketball team that plays in the Lebanese Basketball League (LBL). After winning the Lebanese second division basketball championship in 2015–16, they were promoted to the LBL for the 2016–17 season.

References

External links

Basketball teams in Lebanon
Basketball teams established in 2015
2015 establishments in Lebanon
Keserwan District